Karin Margareta Olsson (born 6 August 1975 in Klippan) is a Swedish bobsledder who has competed since 2000. Her best Bobsleigh World Cup finish was 10th in the two-woman event at Cortina in January 2008.

Olsson also finished 16th in the two-woman event at the 2008 FIBT World Championships in Altenberg. She also competed at the 2002 Winter Olympics.

Olympic sprinter Gunhild Olsson is her mother.

References

External links
FIBT profile

1975 births
Living people
Swedish female bobsledders
Olympic bobsledders of Sweden
Bobsledders at the 2002 Winter Olympics
People from Klippan Municipality
Sportspeople from Skåne County
21st-century Swedish women